Dodecaceria is a genus of marine polychaete worms in the family Cirratulidae.

The genus contains bioluminescent species.

Species
The following species are classified in this genus:
Dodecaceria ater (Quatrefages, 1866)
Dodecaceria berkeleyi Knox, 1972
Dodecaceria capensis Day, 1961
Dodecaceria carolinae Aguilar-Camacho & Salazar-Vallejo, 2011
Dodecaceria choromytilicola Carrasco, 1977
Dodecaceria concharum Örsted, 1843
Dodecaceria coralii (Leidy, 1855)
Dodecaceria cretacea Voigt, 1971
Dodecaceria diceria Hartman, 1951
Dodecaceria fewkesi Berkeley & Berkeley, 1954
Dodecaceria fistulicola Ehlers, 1901
Dodecaceria gallardoi Carrasco, 1977
Dodecaceria inhamata (Hoagland, 1919)
Dodecaceria joubini
Dodecaceria laddi Hartman, 1954
Dodecaceria meridiana Elias & Rivero, 2009
Dodecaceria multifiligera Hartmann-Schröder, 1962
Dodecaceria opulens Gravier, 1908
Dodecaceria pulchra Day, 1955
Dodecaceria saxicola (Grube, 1855)
Dodecaceria sextentaculata (Delle Chiaje, 1822-1826)

References

Terebellida
Bioluminescent annelids